Edmonton-Decore is a provincial electoral district in Alberta, Canada. It is one of 87 districts mandated to return a single member to the Legislative Assembly of Alberta using the first past the post method of voting. It was most recently contested in the general election of 2019.

The riding is located in north central Edmonton. It was created in the 2004 boundary redistribution out of a small part of Edmonton-Manning and most of Edmonton-Glengarry. The riding is named after Laurence Decore, former Leader of the Opposition and Mayor of Edmonton.

Neighborhoods in this riding include: Kildare, Killarney, Northmount, Evansdale, Belle Rive, Mayliewan, Delwood, Glengarry & Balwin.

The riding has been held by representatives of the Progressive Conservative, Liberal, and New Democratic parties since it was created. The current representative is New Democratic Party MLA Chris Nielsen, who was first elected in the 2015 general election.

History
The electoral district was created in the 2004 boundary redistribution from Edmonton-Glengary and Edmonton-Manning, and was first contested in the general election of 2004. The 2010 boundary redistribution saw the major changes made to the riding.

The western boundary with on 97 Street between the Edmonton city limits and 167 Avenue Edmonton-Castle Downs was moved east to cede land to that constituency. The south boundary with Edmonton-Highlands-Norwood was changed to move along 127 Street instead of the Canadian National Railway tracks. The east boundary saw significant changes as it was pushed eastward to 66 Street into Edmonton-Beverly-Clareview and Edmonton-Manning as far north as 144 Avenue from the railway tracks at 127 Street. The east boundary with Edmonton-Manning was also realigned to run on 66 Street north of 153 Avenue to give some land to Manning.

Boundary history

Electoral history

The first election held in the district was fought among Liberal candidate Bill Bonko Sr., a school trustee; incumbent Alberta Alliance MLA Gary Masyk whose old district had been abolished; and former Edmonton-Belmont Progressive Conservative MLA Walter Szwender. Bonko defeated the two incumbents and two other candidates.

In the 2008 general election Bonko was defeated by Progressive Conservative candidate Janice Sarich, who held the riding until 2015.

In the 2015 general election NDP Candidate Chris Nielsen was elected with 68% of the vote, in an election which saw every Edmonton riding return an NDP member.

Election results

2004 general election

2008 general election

2012 general election

2015 general election

2019 general election

Senate nominee results

2004 Senate nominee election district results

Voters had the option of selecting 4 Candidates on the Ballot

2012 Senate nominee election district results

Student Vote results

2004 student election

On November 19, 2004, a Student Vote was conducted at participating Alberta schools to parallel the 2004 Alberta general election results. The vote was designed to educate students and simulate the electoral process for persons who have not yet reached the legal majority. The vote was conducted in 80 of the 83 provincial electoral districts with students voting for actual election candidates. Schools with a large student body that reside in another electoral district had the option to vote for candidates outside of the electoral district then where they were physically located.

References

External links
Website of the Legislative Assembly of Alberta

Alberta provincial electoral districts
Politics of Edmonton